Nikolay Petrunin (27 February 1976 – 12 October 2022) was a Russian politician and a deputy of the 7th and 8th State Dumas. In 2005, he was granted a Candidate of Sciences in Economics degree.

Biography
After graduating from the Vladimir State University, Petrunin worked in commercial organizations. From 1993 to 2015, Petrunin was the director of the Steklo-Gaz corporate group. On September 18, 2016, he was elected deputy of the 7th State Duma. In September 2021, he was re-elected for the 8th State Duma from the Tula Oblast constituency.

He was one of the members of the State Duma sanctioned by the United States Treasury on 24 March 2022, in response to the 2022 Russian invasion of Ukraine.

Petrunin died in October 2022, reportedly from complications of COVID-19. Some regard his death as suspicious.

Awards  
Medal of the Order "For Merit to the Fatherland"

References

1976 births
2022 deaths
United Russia politicians
21st-century Russian politicians
Seventh convocation members of the State Duma (Russian Federation)
Eighth convocation members of the State Duma (Russian Federation)
Recipients of the Medal of the Order "For Merit to the Fatherland" II class
People named in the Pandora Papers
Russian individuals subject to the U.S. Department of the Treasury sanctions
Deaths from the COVID-19 pandemic in Russia
People from Vladimir Oblast